is a railway station in the town of Tozawa, Yamagata, Japan, operated by East Japan Railway Company (JR East).

Lines

Station layout
Furukuchi Station has one island platform, connected to the station building by a level crossing. The station is staffed.

Platforms

History
Furukuchi Station opened on 7 December 1913.

Passenger statistics
In fiscal 2018, the station was used by an average of 30 passengers daily (boarding passengers only). The passenger figures for previous years are as shown below.

Surrounding area
 Mogami River 
 Furukuchi Post Office
 Imagami Onsen

See also
 List of railway stations in Japan

References

External links

 Furukuchi Station information (JR East) 

Stations of East Japan Railway Company
Railway stations in Yamagata Prefecture
Rikuu West Line
Railway stations in Japan opened in 1913
Tozawa, Yamagata